The Norwegian Ornithological Society (NOF) is a Norwegian bird study and conservation organisation.

It was founded in 1957, though it was preceded by a similar body with the same name which operated from 1920 to 1935.  It is BirdLife International’s Norwegian partner organisation.  Key activities of the society include the protection of bird habitats, running conservation projects, educating the public and publishing membership magazines.  It has about 9000 members and four staff and is based in Trondheim.

References

External links
 Norwegian Ornithological Society website

Bird conservation organizations
Animal welfare organisations based in Norway
Ornithology in Norway
 
Ornithological organizations
Organisations based in Trondheim
Environmental organisations based in Norway
Environmental organizations established in 1957
Scientific organizations established in 1957
1957 establishments in Norway
Non-profit organisations based in Norway